The Convair NB-36H was an experimental aircraft that carried a nuclear reactor to test its protective radiation shielding for the crew, but did not use it to power the aircraft. It was nicknamed "The Crusader". It was created for the Aircraft Nuclear Propulsion program, or the ANP, to show the feasibility of a nuclear-powered bomber. Its development ended with the cancellation of the ANP program.

Design and development
The Aircraft Nuclear Propulsion (ANP) program, and the preceding Nuclear Energy for the Propulsion of Aircraft (NEPA) project, worked to develop a nuclear propulsion system for aircraft. The United States Army Air Forces initiated Project NEPA on May 28, 1946. After funding of $10 million in 1947, NEPA operated until May 1951, when the project was transferred to the joint Atomic Energy Commission (AEC)/USAF ANP. The USAF pursued two different systems for nuclear-powered jet engines, the Direct Air Cycle concept, which was developed by General Electric, and Indirect Air Cycle, which was assigned to Pratt & Whitney.  The program was intended to develop and test the Convair X-6, a planned prototype for a fully functional nuclear-powered airplane.

In 1952, Carswell Air Force Base in Texas was hit by a tornado, severely damaging a number of aircraft. One of the damaged airplanes was a B-36 bomber, and Convair suggested to the Air Force that it should be converted into an early prototype for the X-6, instead of being repaired. The Air Force agreed to this plan, and provided funding for an overhaul of the airplane. The intention was to test fly an airplane with a functioning nuclear engine on board, but with it not yet powering the airplane at this stage.

The original crew and avionics cabin was replaced by a massive lead- and rubber-lined 11 ton crew section for a pilot, copilot, flight engineer and two nuclear engineers. Even the small windows had  lead glass. This was hung on a hook in the middle bomb bay to allow for easy loading and unloading, so that the radioactive source could be kept safely underground between the test flights. A monitoring system dubbed "Project Halitosis" measured radioactive gases from the reactor.

Operational history

The NB-36H completed 47 test flights and 215 hours of flight time (during 89 of which the reactor was operated) between September 17, 1955, and March 1957 over New Mexico and Texas. The test flights revealed, that with the shielding used, the crew would not be endangered by radiation from the reactor, including with low-altitude flights, but that there was a risk of radioactive contamination in the event of an accident.

In 1957, at the end of its run of flight tests, the NB-36H was decommissioned and scrapped at Carswell. The nuclear reactor was removed. With Cold War tensions increasing in the late 1950s, the US government pushed for development of a heavy bomber with jet engines. Parallel programs of nuclear and conventional aircraft development sought to achieve this goal, but progress on the nuclear plane was slow. President Dwight Eisenhower was not convinced of the need for the program, and he did not assign any urgency to it, although he did maintain funding. By the late 1950s the concept of nuclear-powered planes was increasingly seen by Congress as redundant, given the ongoing advances in supersonic aviation and ballistic missile development.

In March 1961, shortly after he took office, President John F. Kennedy canceled the program. In his statement, Kennedy commented that the prospect of nuclear-powered planes was still very remote, despite 15 years of development and expenditure of around $1 billion. The Convair X-6 was never built, and the NB-36H is to date the only American aircraft to carry an operational nuclear reactor. The scientific work carried out for the project did have some lasting value however, including methods for handling liquid metals and fused salts, which aided the development of nuclear generators and reactors used by NASA.

Specifications

See also

References

Citations

Bibliography
 Winchester, Jim. Concept Aircraft: Prototypes, X-Planes, and Experimental Aircraft. Thunder Bay Press, 2005.

External links

 
 

Nuclear-powered aircraft
NB-36
Six-engined pusher aircraft
Aircraft with auxiliary jet engines
High-wing aircraft
1950s United States experimental aircraft
Aircraft first flown in 1955
NB-36H